Qalandia, also Kalandiya, is  a Palestinian village located in the West Bank, between Jerusalem and Ramallah, just west from the Jerusalem municipality boundary. In 2006, 1,154 people were living in the village according to the Palestinian Central Bureau of Statistics. Qalandia is also the name of a refugee camp, established by UNRWA in 1949. It is located just east from Jerusalem municipality. Qalandia refugee camp was built for Palestinians refugees from Lydda, Ramle and Jerusalem of the 1948 Palestinian exodus.

History
Ancient tombs have been found at Kalandia.

A Byzantine bath has been excavated, and pottery from the same period has also been located there.

During the Crusader period, it was noted that Kalandia was one of 21 villages given by King Godfrey as a fief to the canons of the Holy Sepulchre. In 1151 the Abbot leased the use of  the vineyards and orchards of Kalandia to a Nemes the Syrian and his brother Anthony and their children. In return the convent was given a part of  the yearly production from these fields. In 1152 Queen Melisende exchanged villagers whom she owned for shops and two moneychanger counters in Jerusalem. All the names of the Kalandia villagers were Christian, which indicate that Kalandia was a Christian village at the time.

Ottoman era
Kalandia, like the rest of Palestine, was incorporated into the Ottoman Empire in 1517, and in the Ottoman census of 1596, the village, called Qalandiya, was a part of the nahiya ("subdistrict") of Al-Quds which was under the administration of the liwa ("district") of Al-Quds. The village had a population of 15 households, all Muslim, and paid a fixed tax rate of 33.3% on wheat, barley, olives, beehives and/or goats, in addition to occasional revenues; a total of 3,900 akçe.

In 1838, it was noted as a Muslim village in the Jerusalem District.

In 1863, the French explorer Victor Guérin visited the village, which he described as small hamlet consisting of a few houses with fig plantations  around  them, while an Ottoman village list of about 1870 showed 16 houses and a population of 50, though  the population count included only the men. 

In 1883, the PEF's Survey of Western Palestine described the village as a "small village on a swell, surrounded by olives, with quarries to the west."

In 1896 the population of Kalandije was estimated to be about 150 persons.

British Mandate era
In the 1922 census of Palestine conducted by the British Mandate authorities, Qalandieh (Qalandia) had a population of 144, of which 122 Muslims and 22 Jews. This had decreased in the 1931 census when Qalandiya had an all-Muslim population of 120, in 25 houses.

In the 1945 survey, Kalandia had a population of 190 Muslims, and a land area of 3,940 dunams. 427 dunams were designated for plantations and irrigable land, 2,202 for cereals, while six dunams were built-up.

Kalandia airport

Until 1927, Kalandia was the only airport in Mandatory Palestine, although there were several military airfields. Kalandia was used for prominent guests bound for Jerusalem. It opened for regular flights in 1936. After the Six-Day War, it was renamed Atarot Airport by Israel, but closed down due to disturbances related to the Israeli–Palestinian conflict, and because international companies refused to land there. Israel confiscated 639 dunums from Kalandia village in order to establish a military base at the former airport.

1947–1949
During the 1947–1948 Civil War in Mandatory Palestine, in early January 1948, the residents of Kalandia evacuated the village and moved to Ramallah, leaving a few young men to protect the property and make sure mines were not planted on the way leading to the village and the nearby mine. The villagers returned to the village and after the news of the Deir Yassin massacre arrived the women, the children and most of the men were evacuated again and the village became a post of the Arab Liberation Army In the wake of the 1948 Arab–Israeli War, and after the 1949 Armistice Agreements, Kalandia came under Jordanian rule. It was annexed by Jordan in 1950.

Kalandia refugee camp

The Qalandia refugee camp was established in 1949 by the Red Cross on land leased from Jordan. Israeli authorities consider it part of Greater Jerusalem, and it remains under their control.

1967-present
Since the Six-Day War in 1967, Kalandia has been under Israeli occupation.

After the 1995 accords, 2% of  Qalandiya’s land was classified as Area B, while the remaining 98% is Area C. Israel has confiscated 574 dunams of land from Qalandiya in order to construct the Israeli industrial settlement Atarot and 639 dunams for the Israeli Qalandiya military base. 1,940 dunums of the village, 59.3% of the village’s total area is isolated behind the Israeli West Bank barrier.

The Qalandia checkpoint is the main checkpoint between the northern West Bank and Jerusalem, and is known for frequent demonstrations against the occupation.

The Israeli 2013 Qalandia raid led to clashes with local residents, leaving three of Qalandia's inhabitants dead and several critically wounded.

References

Bibliography

External links
Welcome To Qalandiya
Qalandia, Welcome to Palestine
Survey of Western Palestine, Map 17:    IAA, Wikimedia commons
Qalandiya Village (Fact Sheet), Applied Research Institute–Jerusalem, (ARIJ)
 Qalandiya Village Profile, ARIJ
Qalandiya areal photo, ARIJ
Locality Development Priorities and Needs in Qalandiya, ARIJ  
Kalandia Refugee Camp, articles from  UNRWA.
Photostory: The Kalandia Terminal
Two Israeli families attacked in Qalandiya after losing their way
Kalandia Checkpoint acts as door to Jerusalem

Populated places established in 1949
Villages in the West Bank
Jerusalem Governorate
Municipalities of the State of Palestine